Acer barbatum is a confused scientific name for a North American maple.

 A plant originally described by André Michaux in 1803, a synonym of Acer saccharum
 A plant originally described by  William Jackson Hooker in 1831, a synonym of Acer glabrum
 A plant so named in some recent texts, a synonym of Acer floridanum